Diario di una schizofrenica (internationally released as Diary of a Schizophrenic Girl) is a 1968 Italian drama film directed by Nelo Risi. It is based on the autobiographic book Journal d'une schizophrène The film was awarded with the Nastro d'Argento for best screenplay.

Cast 
Ghislaine D'Orsay : Anna
Margarita Lozano : Bianca
Umberto Raho : Mr. Zeno
Marija Tocinoski : Mrs. Zeno

Release
The film was shown at the 1968 Venice Film Festival. It was claimed that the film was also shown to the public during the festival and in Milan before 31 October 1968, however, the Academy of Motion Picture Arts and Sciences ruled that these showing did not constitute a commercial release and ruled the film ineligible as the Italian entry for the Academy Awards.

References

External links

1968 films
Films directed by Nelo Risi
Italian drama films
1960s Italian films